Luis Fernando Allende Arenas (born November 10, 1952) is a Mexican singer, actor, painter, film producer, and film director.

Early life
Allende was born in Mexico. His father is Mexican, and his mother is from Cuba. Allende's grandfather on his father's side was Puerto Rican. Both grandparents on his mother side are from Spain.

By the late 1960s, Allende had ventured into Spanish-language soap operas as well as photo soap operas (magazine soap operas widely produced during the 1970s in many Latin American countries). His matinee idol looks helped Allende become a teen idol across Latin America.

Career
During the early 1980s, Allende moved to Hollywood, and had respectable success in the "movie capital of the world" landing major roles in important productions.

During the 1981–1982 television season, Allende had a recurring role on the prime time TV series Flamingo Road as Julio Sánchez. Allende also became the host of the Spanish version of the television singing contest Star Search (Buscando Estrellas).

He has directed and produced his own movies and mini series. He was a steady judge of the popular Puerto Rican reality show Objetivo Fama, and hosted his own television variety show called: Entre Amigos (Among Friends).

He owns El Dorado Studios, a TV and motion picture facility in Dorado, Puerto Rico. He has been working on a multicultural theme sitcom made in Puerto Rico called "Qué familia más normal" on TuTv, with actors from Mexico and Puerto Rico.

In December 2007, he was the host for Miss World 2007 in Sanya, China, with Angela Chow. He repeated as host in Miss World 2017 and Miss World 2018.

Allende stars in "Mexican Dynasties," a reality show filmed in Mexico City about three influential and affluent families in Mexico and which premiered on Bravo in March 2019.

Filmography

Telenovelas
 Muchacha italiana viene a casarse (2014-2015) - Sergio Ángeles
 La Mujer Del Vendaval (2012-2013) as Luciano
 Esperanza del Corazón (2011) as Orlando Duarte
 Sortilegio (2009) as Antonio
 Besos prohibidos (1999) as José Luis
 Maria Bonita (1995)as José Santos/Damar Santoyo 
 Sangre de lobos (1991)
 Amor de nadie as Guillermo (1990)
 Grecia as Fernando (1987)
 Tiempo de amar (1987)
 Corazón salvaje (1977)as Renato 
 El milagro de vivir (1975)
 Ana del aire as Gerardo (1974)
El amor tiene cara de mujer (1971)

TV series
 Como dice el dicho (2014) as Roberto 
 Superboy (1989) as club owner 
 Miami Vice (1986) as Tico Arriola 
 Hunter (1985)as Moreno 
 The Hitchhiker (1985) as Victor 
 Murder, She Wrote (1985) as Miguel Santana 
 Master of the Game (1984) as George Mellis 
 Hart to Hart (1983) as Fernando 
 Flamingo Road (1981–1982) as Julio Sánchez 
 The Phoenix (1981) as Diego DeVarga

Movies
 Maria (2010)
 El Cimarrón (2006)
 Slayer_(film) (2006) as Luis 
 Siempre te amaré (2004) as Lead 
 Naked Lies (1998) as Damian Medina 
 Angely smerti (1993)
 Stalingrad (1989) as a Captain Ruben Ruiz Ibarruri, Hero of Soviet Union and a great hero of Battle of Stalingrad, son of Spanish Communist Leader Dolores Ibarruri
 Beverly Hills Brats (1989) as Roberto 
 Un Hombre y una mujer con suerte (1988)
 The Alamo: Thirteen Days to Glory (1987) as Alamonte 
 Murder in Three Acts (1986) as Ricardo Montoya 
 Heartbreaker (1983) as Beto 
 Johnny Chicano (1981)
 El Lobo negro (1981)
 Duelo a muerte (1981) as Carlos Aceves/El Lobo Negro 
 Con la muerte en ancas (1980) as Casey Kelly 
 El Contrabando del paso (1980)
 El hombre de los hongos (1980) as Sebastián 
 Frontera (1980) as Fernando 
 Verano salvaje (1980)
 La Venganza del lobo negro (1980)
 The Streets of L.A. (1979) as Ramon "Gallo" Zamora 
 La Ilegal (1979)
 Te quiero (1979)
 La Guera Rodriguez (1978)
 La Coquito as Julio (1977)
 ¿Y ahora qué, señor fiscal? (1977)
 La Virgen de Guadalupe (1976) as Juan Diego 
 El Pacto (1976) as Sergio 
 Negro es un bello color (1974) as Mario 
 El Desconocido (1974)
 El Primer amor (1974)
 El Amor tiene cara de mujer (1973)
 Mecánica nacional (1972)
 María (1972) as Efraín 
 Para servir a usted (1971)

External links
 
 Official Website

1952 births
Living people
20th-century Mexican male actors
21st-century Mexican male actors
Male actors from Mexico City
Mexican expatriates in Puerto Rico
Mexican male film actors
Mexican male telenovela actors
Mexican people of Cuban descent
Mexican people of Puerto Rican descent
Mexican people of Spanish descent